The Philadelphia Phillies are a Major League Baseball team based in Philadelphia, Pennsylvania. They  are a member of the Eastern Division of Major League Baseball's National League. The team has played officially under two names since beginning play in 1883: the current moniker, as well as the "Quakers", which was used in conjunction with "Phillies" during the team's early history. The team was also known unofficially as the "Blue Jays" during the World War II era. Since the franchise's inception,  players have made an appearance in a competitive game for the team, whether as an offensive player (batting and baserunning) or a defensive player (fielding, pitching, or both).

Of those  Phillies, 97 have had surnames beginning with the letter R. Two of those players have been inducted into the Baseball Hall of Fame: pitcher Eppa Rixey, who was a Phillie for six seasons in two different stints (1912–1917, 1919); and Robin Roberts, who won 20 games during the 1950 season as the ace pitcher of the Whiz Kids. The Hall of Fame lists the Phillies as Roberts' primary team; during his career, the right-hander won 234 games and lost 199, the latter one of his three franchise records. During his 14 seasons with the team, he pitched 3,739  innings and completed 272 games, both records; he also held the major league record for most career home runs allowed until it was broken in 2010. Roberts was also elected to the Philadelphia Baseball Wall of Fame as the Phillies' first inductee in 1978.

Among the 49 batters in this list, second baseman Lou Raymond has the highest batting average, at .500; he notched one hit in two career at-bats. No other player on this list has batted above .300; the next-highest average belongs to Pete Rose, Major League Baseball's all-time hits leader, who batted .291 in his five seasons with Philadelphia. Jimmy Rollins leads all members of this list in home runs and runs batted in, with 154 and 662, respectively.

Of this list's 48 pitchers, Chuck Ricci has the best win–loss record, in terms of winning percentage; he won one game and lost none in his seven appearances with the Phillies. Roberts' 234 victories and 199 defeats are the highest totals in this list, and he also leads in strikeouts, with 1,871. Ricci's 1.80 earned run average (ERA) is the lowest among this list's pitchers; one position player, second baseman Cookie Rojas, has a 0.00 ERA in his only pitching appearance.

Footnotes
Key
 The National Baseball Hall of Fame and Museum determines which cap a player wears on their plaque, signifying "the team with which he made his most indelible mark". The Hall of Fame considers the player's wishes in making their decision, but the Hall makes the final decision as "it is important that the logo be emblematic of the historical accomplishments of that player’s career".
 Players are listed at a position if they appeared in 30% of their games or more during their Phillies career, as defined by Baseball-Reference. Additional positions may be shown on the Baseball-Reference website by following each player's citation.
 Franchise batting and pitching leaders are drawn from Baseball-Reference. A total of 1,500 plate appearances are needed to qualify for batting records, and 500 innings pitched or 50 decisions are required to qualify for pitching records.
 Statistics are correct as of the end of the 2010 Major League Baseball season.

Table
 Leroy Reams is listed by Baseball-Reference without a position; he appeared in one career game for the Phillies on May 7, 1969.
 Dutch Rudolph is listed by Baseball-Reference as a right fielder, but never appeared in a game in the field for the Phillies.

References
General

Inline citations

R